Memorijal Hakija Turajlić is a boxing tournament named in honor of Hakija Turajlić, a former Bosnian politician, economist and businessman who was assassinated in 1993 during the Bosnian War. The first Memorijal Hakija Turajlić was held in 1994, during the Siege of Sarajevo, and since then more than 500 boxers from 30 countries have participated in the tournament. 

From 1998. until 2008. it was one of strongest  amateur boxing tournaments in Bosnia and Herzegovina.

Notable boxers 
A large number of high quality amateur boxers have competed at the Memorijal Hakija Turajlić:

 Magomed Aripgadjiev
 Magomed Nurutdinov
 Damir Beljo
 Džemal Bošnjak
 Nermin Bašović
 Almedin Fetahović
 Džemal Fetahović
 Adem Fetahović
 Memnun Hadžić
 Darko Kučuk
 Esmir Kukić
 Mirsad Majstorić
 Emil Markić
 Izet Mrkulić
 Enes Peštek
 Halid Ranica
 Adnan Redžović
 Jasmin Sejdinović
 Hamid Šemić
 Hajrudin Šerifović
 Muharem Šuvalić
 Emir Telalović
 Velibor Vidić
 Stevo Zolak
 Ismet Žerić
 Detelin Dalakliev
 Spas Genov
 Sergey Rozhnov
 Salim Salimov
 Alen Babić
 Jetiš Bajrami
 Stjepan Božić
 Marko Čalić
 Stipe Drews
 Filip Palić
 Mirko Filipović
 Marijo Šivolija
 Marko Tomasović
 Costas Philippou
 Ramadan Yasser
 Stefan Härtel
 Artur Schmidt
 Csaba Kurtucz
 Dean Byrne
 Darren O'Neill
 Veli Mumin
 Alen Beganović
 Boško Drašković
 Bojan Pešić
 Liben Salazar
 Ionut Gheorghe
 Ionut Ion
 Valeri Chechenev
 Zoran Mitrović
 Milan Piperski
 Nikola Sjekloca
 Milan Vasiljević
 Dejan Zavec
 José Kelvin de la Nieve Linares
 Eric Pambani
 Herry Saliku Biembe
 David Roethlisberger
 Stephane Roethlisberger
 Arnold Gjergjaj

References

External links 
Memorijalni bokserski turnir Hakija Turajlić

International sports competitions hosted by Bosnia and Herzegovina
Sport in Sarajevo
Boxing in Bosnia and Herzegovina